Elke Decker (born 23 February 1957) is a German female former track and field sprinter who competed in the 400 metres for West Germany. Born in Cologne, her greatest achievement was a gold medal at the 1980 European Athletics Indoor Championships. She also represented her country individually at the 1978 European Athletics Championships and 1982 European Athletics Indoor Championships, as well as in the 4 × 400 metres relay team at the 1979 IAAF World Cup.

Decker was a three-time national champion, winning the 400 m title once outdoors in 1979 and twice indoors in 1977 and 1980. She also topped the rankings as a guest at the Israeli Athletics Championships in 1986. She was a member of TuS 04 Leverkusen athletic club during her career.

International competitions

National titles
West German Athletics Championships
400 m: 1979
West German Indoor Athletics Championships
400 m: 1977, 1980

See also
List of European Athletics Indoor Championships medalists (women)

References

External links

Living people
1957 births
Athletes from Cologne
West German female sprinters
German female sprinters